Nizhny Suyan (Tübänge Höyän) is a rural locality (a selo) in Verkhnesuyansky Selsoviet, Karaidelsky District, Bashkortostan, Russia. The population was 1 as of 2010. There is 1 street.

Geography 
Nizhny Suyan is located 25 km northeast of Karaidel (the district's administrative centre) by road. Mullakayevo is the nearest rural locality.

References 

Rural localities in Karaidelsky District